Mother ( or ; also known as Woman Requiem) is a 1985 South Korean film directed by Park Chul-soo. It won several awards at the Grand Bell Awards, including Best Film.

Plot 
After the rape and subsequent suicide of a college student, her mother takes revenge on those responsible.

Cast
Youn Yuh-jung
Jeon Hye-seong
Shin Seong-il
Kim In-tae
Hong Seong-min
Kook Jong-hwan
Yang Taek-jo
Song Ok-sook
Jeon In-taek
Nam Po-dong

References

External links 
 
 

1985 films
Best Picture Grand Bell Award winners
1980s Korean-language films
South Korean thriller drama films
Rape and revenge films
Films directed by Park Chul-soo
Works by Kim Soo-hyun (writer)